The 1928 Massachusetts gubernatorial election was held on November 6, 1928.

Incumbent Republican Lieutenant Governor Frank G. Allen was elected to a two-year term, defeating Democrat Charles H. Cole. 

The 1928 election represents a major turning point in Massachusetts political history. Al Smith's victory in the state's presidential contest and the competitive gubernatorial election marked a departure from decades of Republican dominance.

Republican primary

Governor

Candidates
Frank G. Allen, Lieutenant Governor
Frank A. Goodwin, Registrar of Motor Vehicles

Results
Lieutenant Governor Frank Allen was nominated over Frank A. Goodwin.

Lieutenant Governor

Candidates
George A. Bacon, former Chairman of the Massachusetts Republican Party
Charles L. Burrill, former Treasurer and Receiver-General of Massachusetts (1915–1920)
Pehr G. Holmes, member of the Massachusetts Executive Council and former Mayor of Worcester (1917–1920)
John C. Hull, Speaker of the Massachusetts House of Representatives since 1925
Robert M. Leach, former U.S. Representative from Taunton (1924–1925)
Wycliffe C. Marshall
John H. Sherburne
William S. Youngman, Treasurer and Receiver-General of Massachusetts since 1925

Results
Treasurer William S. Youngman won the highly competitive primary election by 21,099 votes over Speaker of the Massachusetts House of Representatives John C. Hull.

Democratic primary

Governor

Candidates
Brig. Gen. Charles H. Cole, former Adjutant General of Massachusetts and Commissioner of the Boston Fire and Police Departments
 John J. Cummings, candidate for Lieutenant Governor in 1922 and 1924

Results
Brigadier General Charles Cole easily defeated John J. Cummings for the Democratic nomination.

Lt. Governor

Candidates
John F. Malley, resident of Chestnut Hill
Charles S. Murphy, resident of Worcester

Results

General election

Candidates
Frank G. Allen, incumbent Governor (Republican)
 Chester W. Bixby, founding member of the Communist Party of the United States of America (Workers)
Brig. Gen. Charles H. Cole, former Adjutant General of Massachusetts and Commissioner of the Boston Fire and Police Departments (Democratic)
 Washington Cook, brother of Alonzo B. Cook and independent candidate for United States Senate in 1922 and 1926 (Vigorous Prohibition Enforcement)
 Mary Donovan Hapgood, Secretary of the Sacco-Vanzetti Defense Committee (Socialist)
 Edith Hamilton MacFadden, author (Independent Citizen)
 Stephen Surridge (Socialist Labor)

MacFadden became the first female candidate for Governor in the history of Massachusetts. She ran on a platform of reducing tax exemptions. She is the mother of actor Hamilton MacFadden. She stated that she found "no opposition to a woman aspiring to the executive position of Governor."

Results

See also
 1927–1928 Massachusetts legislature

References

Bibliography

Governor
1928
Massachusetts
November 1928 events in the United States